Piastów railway station is a railway station in Piastów, Poland.  The station is served by Koleje Mazowieckie, who run trains from Skierniewice to Warszawa Wschodnia, and Szybka Kolej Miejska, who run trains on line S1 from Pruszków PKP to Otwock.

External links 
 
Station article at kolej.one.pl

Pruszków County
Railway stations served by Koleje Mazowieckie
Railway stations served by Szybka Kolej Miejska (Warsaw)
Railway stations in Masovian Voivodeship